Cuide ri Cathy (Introduced by Cathy) is a television interview series created by mneTV for BBC Alba, presented by Cathy MacDonald, where she spends a day in the life of a Scottish celebrity.

Episodes

Series 1

 Gail Porter – Television presenter.
 Aggie MacKenzie – Television personality and cleaning guru.
 Kirsty Wark – Presenter on Newsnight.
 Irvine Welsh – Author.
 Andrea McLean – Former weather presenter on GMTV and presenter on Loose Women.
 Mike Blair – Scottish rugby captain.
 David Lunan – Church of Scotland moderator.
 Carol Kirkwood – Weather presenter on BBC Breakfast.
 Donnie Munro – Former Runrig singer.
 Nick Nairn – TV chef.

Series 2

 Liz McColgan – Olympic athlete.
 Chick Young – BBC Scotland sports reporter.
 Alex Norton – Taggart star.
 Aileen McGlynn – Paralympic athlete.
 Jackie Stewart – Racing car driver.
 Una McLean – Veteran actress.
 Leon Jackson – X Factor winner and singer.
 Hardeep Singh Kohli – Presenter and comedian.

External links
 Website

BBC Alba shows
British television talk shows